The Nomenclature of Territorial Units for Statistics (NUTS) is a geocode standard for referencing the subdivisions of Belgium for statistical purposes. The standard is developed and regulated by the European Union. The NUTS standard is instrumental in delivering the European Union's Structural Funds. The NUTS code for Belgium is BE and a hierarchy of three levels is established by Eurostat. Below these is a further levels of geographic organisation - the local administrative unit (LAU). In Belgium, the LAUs are municipalities.

Overall

NUTS Levels

Local administrative units

Below the NUTS levels, the two LAU (Local Administrative Units) levels are:

The LAU codes of Belgium can be downloaded here: ''

NUTS codes

In the 2003 version, the Arrondissement of Verviers was coded BE333.

See also
 Subdivisions of Belgium
 ISO 3166-2 codes of Belgium
 FIPS region codes of Belgium

References

Sources
 Hierarchical list of the Nomenclature of territorial units for statistics - NUTS and the Statistical regions of Europe
 Overview map of EU Countries - NUTS level 1
 BELGIQUE / BELGIË - NUTS level 2
 BELGIQUE / BELGIË - NUTS level 3
 Correspondence between the NUTS levels and the national administrative units
 List of current NUTS codes
 Download current NUTS codes (ODS format)
 Provinces of Belgium, Statoids.com
 Arrondissements of Belgium, Statoids.com

Belgium
Nuts